Pouzauges is a commune in the Vendée département in the Pays de la Loire region in western France.

Geography
The river Lay forms most of the commune's southern border.

Population

Sights and monuments
 The Château de Pouzauges is a ruined 12th century castle.

International relations
The commune is twinned with the English town of Eye in Suffolk. A French road sign showing the distance to Pouzauges was gifted to the town of Eye to commemorate the twinning.

See also
Communes of the Vendée department

References

Communes of Vendée